PPI Automotive Design GmbH  is a German automobile tuner based in Stuttgart, in the Baden-Württemberg district of Germany.  Their cars are based on existing Audi models, for which they offer Aerodynamics, Performance and Interior tuning packages.

PPI stands for: Precision Performance Individuality. 

The company customizes and modifies cars made by Audi.

PPI Automotive Design GmbH is a member of the association of German car modification companies (Verband der Automobile Tuner e.V.  – VDAT).

PPI models
The current line up of cars:
 PPI TT - RSTT (Audi TT mark I base)
 PPI TT - STT (Audi TT mark I base)
 PPI TT - PSTT (Audi TT mark II base)
 PPI TT - PSTTsport (Audi TT mark II base)
 PPI A8 - A8 EXECUTIVE (Audi A8 base)
 PPI Q7 - PS Q7 (Audi Q7 base)
 PPI Q7 - Q7 ICE (Audi Q7 base) - Widebody
 PPI R8 Stage I - PPI R8 (Audi R8 base)
 PPI R8 Stage II - R8 RAZOR (Audi R8 base)
 PPI R8 Stage III - RAZOR GT (Audi R8 base) - Carbon Fiber Widebody
 PPI R8 Stage IV - RAZOR GTR (Audi R8 base) - Carbon Fiber Widebody
 PPI A5/S5 - PS5 (Audi A5 / Audi S5 base)
 PPI RS4 (Audi RS4 base)
 PPI RS6 (Audi RS6 base)

There are plans to have a tuning program for all current Audi models.

Gallery

External links
 PPI website

Audi
Auto parts suppliers of Germany
Automotive motorsports and performance companies
Companies based in Stuttgart
Technology companies established in 2004